The Cloth Peddler was a full-length Azerbaijani silent comedy film made in the capital city  Baku in pre-Soviet Union 1917, based on the operetta by the Azerbaijani composer Uzeyir Hajibeyov.

Plot

Set in Baku at the turn of the 20th century, a young successful businessman Asgar (Huseynqulu Sarabski) wishes to marry. He wants his bride to be the choice of his heart, however, Azerbaijani tradition restricted him from communicating with the lady as a lover before marriage. So Asgar decides to disguise himself as a mere cloth peddler and the young woman Guelchoehra (Ahmed Aghdamski) falls in love with him. However, she is concerned that her father, Soltan bey (Alakbar Huseynzade) will not allow her to marry a cloth peddler. Young Asgar then reveals himself to her father and asks for her hand in marriage. Seeing that he is indeed a wealthy young man, the father agrees and the two are permitted to marry.

Cast
Huseynqulu Sarabski (Asgar),
Ahmed Aghdamski (Guelhohra),
Alakbar Huseynzade (Soltan bey)
Yunis Narimanov (Jahan khala)
Mirzaagha Aliyev (Suleyman)
Alexandra Olenskaya (Asya)
Hanafi Terequlov (Vali)
Yeva Olenskaya (Telli)

Release
The film was remade into a more popular version in 1945 and was performed on the stage in Azerbaijan.
For the 1945 remake see The Cloth Peddler.

See also
List of Azerbaijani films: 1898-1919

References

External links and sources
 

Films of the Russian Empire
1917 films
Azerbaijani black-and-white films
Azerbaijani silent films
Azerbaijani-language films
1917 comedy films
Films based on operettas
Azerbaijani comedy films